WWUF (97.7 FM) is a radio station broadcasting a Hot AC format. It is licensed to Waycross, Georgia, United States. The station is currently owned by John Higgs' Broadcast South, through licensee Higgs Multimedia Group, LLC, and features programming from ABC Radio.

History
The station was assigned the call sign WMUI on February 29, 1984. On November 27, 1985, it changed its call sign to WASE, and changed on January 21, 1986, to the current WWUF.

On January 1, 2009, WWUF changed its format from oldies to classic hits, and on December 26, 2009, changed its format to hot AC.  Current programming comes from Cumulus Media's Today's Best Hits format.

References

External links

WUF
Hot adult contemporary radio stations in the United States